Beausoleil First Nation is an Ojibwe First Nation band government located in Simcoe County, Ontario, Canada. The main settlement of the Beausoleil First Nation is on Christian Island, Ontario, Canada in southern Georgian Bay. As of 2018, the total number of status Native Americans registered with the First Nation is 2,587. The on-reserve population is 614.

Reserve lands 
The Beausoleil First Nation occupies three Indian reserves. Their main First Nations Reserve is the Christian Island 30 Indian Reserve, consisting of Christian Island, a large island in Georgian Bay close to the communities of Penetanguishene and Midland, Ontario, along with two nearby smaller islands, Hope Island, and Beckwith Island - both uninhabited.

Governance
The First Nation elects their leadership through the Indian Act for a two-year term.  The First Nation's council consists of a chief and six councillors.  The current chief is Joanne Sandy. The First Nation is a member of Ogemawahj Tribal Council, a regional Chiefs' council, and the Assembly of First Nations.

Services
 Administration
 Communications
 Information Technology
 Human Resources
 Purchasing
 Education
 Public Works
 Waste Management
 Roads Maintenance
 Chimnissing N'biish Gamig
 Housing
 Social Services
 Child and Family services
 Christian Island Latchkey Program
 Christian Island Youth Services
 Guiding Lights Seniors Centre
 Lands Management
 Transportation
 Economic Development
 Health Services
 Emergency Medical Services
 Fire Department
 Christian Island United Church

References

External links
AANDC profile
Aboriginal Canada Portal

First Nations governments in Ontario
Ojibwe governments
Ojibwe in Canada